Luiz Paulo Teixeira Ferreira (born 6 May 1961), known as Paulo Teixeira, a Brazilian politician, lawyer, and professor who belongs to the Partido dos Trabalhadores (PT, or Workers’ Party). He is currently a federal deputy  in the lower house of the Brazilian Parliament, where he served as PT party leader in 2011

Early life and education
Teixeira, who is a brother of State Representative Luiz Fernando Teixeira, received a Master of Science in Constitutional Law from the University of São Paulo.

Career
Teixeira was a São Paulo state deputy twice, in 1994-1995 and 1998–2000. From 2001 to 2004 he served as Municipal Secretary of Habitation and Human Development in the municipality of São Paulo; from 2003 to 2004 he was Chief Executive Officer of the Metropolitan Housing Company of São Paulo (COHAB); and from 2004 to 2007 he was a city councilman in São Paulo. He was elected a federal deputy in 2006, taking office in 2007, and was re-elected to Parliament in 2010.

He was a candidate for president of PT in 2013. He supports political reform and was critical of PT's then alliance with the Brazilian Democratic Movement Party (PMDB).

He was supportive of ex-president Lula when he was questioned and tried in connection with the scandal known as Operation Car Wash.

In a 2015 op-ed for O Globo, Teixeira praised then president Dilma Rousseff for vetoing corporate financing of election campaigns and political parties, saying that by doing so she had shown “deep respect for democracy.”

References

External links
 Paulo Teixeira's web site

1961 births
Living people
People from São Paulo (state)
University of São Paulo alumni
Members of the Legislative Assembly of São Paulo
Members of the Chamber of Deputies (Brazil) from São Paulo
Workers' Party (Brazil) politicians